The Harry Packer Mansion, is a historic home located at Jim Thorpe, Carbon County, Pennsylvania. The mansion was designed by architect Addison Hutton and built in 1874.  It is a -story, three-bay-wide, red-brick dwelling  in the Italianate style. The front facade features a verandah constructed of green Vermont sandstone and a bell tower attached to the two-story extension. It was given as a wedding gift to Harry Packer from his father Asa Packer.

The residence was added to the National Register of Historic Places on November 20, 1974.  It is located in the Old Mauch Chunk Historic District.

See also
National Register of Historic Places listings in Carbon County, Pennsylvania

In popular culture
The mansion appeared in the season 5 episode of Fetch! with Ruff Ruffman "Ruffman Manor is Haunted" where it was used as the setting for Ruffman Manor.

The exterior of the Harry Packer Mansion in Jim Thorpe was the inspiration for the Haunted Mansion ride at Disney World.

References

External links
 Harry Packer Mansion

Houses on the National Register of Historic Places in Pennsylvania
Italianate architecture in Pennsylvania
Victorian architecture in Pennsylvania
Houses completed in 1874
Houses in Carbon County, Pennsylvania
National Register of Historic Places in Carbon County, Pennsylvania